The women's 10,000 metres competition of the athletics events at the 2019 Pan American Games will take place between the 6 August at the 2019 Pan American Games Athletics Stadium. The defending Pan American Games champion is Brenda Flores from Mexico.

Records
Prior to this competition, the existing world and Pan American Games records were as follows:

Schedule

Results
All times shown are in seconds.

Final
The results were as follows:

References

Athletics at the 2019 Pan American Games
2019